Gwynyth Walsh (born 1956) is a Canadian actress best known for her role of the Star Trek character B'Etor, one of the Duras sisters. She also played constable Nimira in the Star Trek: Voyager episode "Random Thoughts", and provided the voice for the character Grey Mother, in the video game The Long Dark. Walsh earned her Bachelor of Fine Arts at the University of Alberta and started her career appearing on stage across Canada and in the United States in many classics. For Shakespeare's Much Ado About Nothing she won a Dramalogue Award - Best Actress for her portrayal of Beatrice. Her first appearance on screen was in a 1983 TV movie Pajama Tops.

Filmography

Film

Television

References

External links

 
 

Actresses from Winnipeg
Canadian film actresses
Canadian stage actresses
Canadian television actresses
Canadian voice actresses
Living people
University of Alberta alumni
20th-century Canadian actresses
21st-century Canadian actresses
1950 births